The 1985–86 Jacksonville Dolphins men's basketball team represented Jacksonville University as members of the Sun Belt Conference during the 1985–86 NCAA Division I men's basketball season. The Dolphins, led by 5th-year head coach Bob Wenzel, played their home games at Jacksonville Memorial Coliseum in Jacksonville, Florida.

After finishing third in the Sun Belt regular season standings, Jacksonville won the conference tournament to receive an automatic bid to the NCAA tournament as No. 8 seed in the Midwest region. The team was beaten by No. 9 seed Temple, 61–50 in OT, in the opening round to end the season 21–10 (9–5 Sun Belt). To date, this season marks the school's most recent appearance in the NCAA Tournament.

Roster

Schedule and results

|-
!colspan=12 style=| Non-conference regular season

|-
!colspan=12 style=| Sun Belt Conference regular season

|-
!colspan=12 style=| Sun Belt Conference tournament
|-

|-
!colspan=9 style=| NCAA tournament

Source

References

Jacksonville Dolphins men's basketball seasons
Jacksonville Dolphins
Jacksonville
Jacksonville Dolphins men's basketball
Jacksonville Dolphins men's basketball